Tupuxuara is a genus of large, crested, and toothless pterodactyloid pterosaur from the Early Cretaceous period (Albian stage) of what is now the Romualdo Formation of the Santana Group, Brazil, about 125 to 112 million years ago. Tupuxuara is a close relative of Thalassodromeus, and both form a group that is either called Thalassodrominae (if placed within the family Tapejaridae) or Thalassodromidae (if placed within the clade Neoazhdarchia).

Discovery 

 

The genus was named and described by Alexander Kellner and Diógenes de Almeida Campos in 1988. The type species is Tupuxuara longicristatus. The generic name refers to a familiar spirit from the mythology of the Tupi. The specific name means "long-crested" in Latin.

The holotype, MN 6591-V, was found in the Early Cretaceous (Albian) Santana Formation (now known as the Romualdo Formation) of Brazil. It consists of a snout and some partial wing bones. Mature individuals of T. longicristatus had a back-swept crest arising from the snout. Much more fossil material has later been found, showing considerable variation in morphology. Some researchers explain this as intra-specific variability, being caused by a difference in age or sex. Others, however, assume there are different species present.

In 1994 a second species was named by Kellner: Tupuxuara leonardii. The specific name honors Giuseppe Leonardi. The holotype is MN 6592-V, a fragmentary skull with a more rounded crest. Other such material has been referred to T. leonardii.

In 2009 a third species was named, by Mark Witton: Tupuxuara deliradamus. The holotype is SMNK PAL 6410, a skull. Another skull is the paratype: KPMNH DL 84. The specific name is derived from Latin delirus, "insane" or "crazy", and adamas, "invincible", but also the word from which "diamond" is derived. The species has a distinctive diamond-shaped skull opening and low eye sockets. The name is a tribute to the song "Shine On You Crazy Diamond" by Pink Floyd, one of Witton's favorite bands. A 2023 study classifies T. deliradamus as a tapejarine instead of thalassodromine, and a sister species of Caupedactylus.

Classification 
Tupuxuara is a member of the group Azhdarchoidea. Kellner assigned it to the Tapejaridae within Azhdarchoidea. According to some analyses however, Tupuxuara is closer to the Azhdarchidae (the group that includes the giant Texan form Quetzalcoatlus) than to Tapejara and its relatives.
 
The cladogram below follows the 2011 analysis of Felipe Pinheiro and colleagues.

Below is a cladogram showing the phylogenetic placement of Tupuxuara within Neoazhdarchia from Andres and Myers (2013).

Paleobiology 
It was once been suggested that Tupuxuara was a fish eater at the coasts of South America, while some deviant hypotheses include the possibility it was a fruit eater. However, based on its azhdarchoid affinities, it was most likely a terrestrial omnivore or carnivore. The closely related Thalassodromeus was specialized for larger prey, while both Tupuxuara species lacked such specializations.

A subadult described by David Martill and Darren Naish from the University of Portsmouth in 2006 had not yet fully developed its crest, which supports the suggestion that the crest was a marker for sexual maturity.

Comparisons between the scleral rings of Tupuxuara and modern birds and reptiles suggest that it may have been diurnal.

See also 
 List of pterosaur genera
 Timeline of pterosaur research

References

External links 
 BBC News, "Flying reptile mystery 'solved'", July 27, 2006

Tapejaromorphs
Early Cretaceous pterosaurs of South America
Cretaceous Brazil
Fossils of Brazil
Crato Formation
Romualdo Formation
Fossil taxa described in 1988
Taxa named by Alexander Kellner
Extinct reptiles